Russian hostage crisis might refer to:

 Budyonnovsk hospital hostage crisis in June 1995
 Kizlyar-Pervomayskoye hostage crisis in January 1996
 Black Sea hostage crisis also in January 1996
 Moscow theater hostage crisis in October 2002
 Beslan school hostage crisis in September 2004